Several high schools are known as Camden High School including:

Camden High School (New Jersey)
Camden High School (Camden, New York)
Camden High School (Camden, South Carolina)
Camden High School (San Jose, California)
Camden High School (New South Wales) (Australia)

See also
Camden County High School (disambiguation)